Richard Lieber Log Cabin, also known as the Old Log Cabin, is a historic log cabin located at Turkey Run State Park in Sugar Creek Township, Parke County, Indiana. It was built in 1848, and completely rebuilt in 1918. It is a one-story, hewn poplar log structure with a side-gable roof.  It has a frame ell.  The original log structure measures 30 feet wide and 20 feet deep and features a cat and clay chimney.

It was added to the National Register of Historic Places in 2001.

References

Log houses in the United States
Houses on the National Register of Historic Places in Indiana
Houses completed in 1848
Buildings and structures in Parke County, Indiana
National Register of Historic Places in Parke County, Indiana
Log buildings and structures on the National Register of Historic Places in Indiana